Robert Claude Henri Chef d'Hôtel (2 February 1922 – 19 October 2019) was a track and field athlete from France, who competed mainly in the men's 400 metres during his career. He was born in Nouméa, Sud, New Caledonia in February 1922.

Chef d'Hôtel competed for France at the 1948 Summer Olympics held in London, Great Britain where he won the silver medal in the men's 4 × 400 metre relay with his teammates Jean Kerebel, Francis Schewetta and Jacques Lunis.

He died on 19 October 2019, at the age of 97.

References

External links
 
 

1922 births
2019 deaths
Athletes (track and field) at the 1948 Summer Olympics
European Athletics Championships medalists
French male sprinters
Medalists at the 1948 Summer Olympics
New Caledonian male sprinters
Olympic athletes of France
Olympic silver medalists for France
Olympic silver medalists in athletics (track and field)
People from Nouméa
20th-century French people
21st-century French people